Robert Sens (born 29 October 1977 in Schwerin) is a German rower. He has won three gold and one bronze at the World Rowing Championships, gold in the M2- at the 1998 World Rowing Championships, gold in the M4x at the 2002 World Rowing Championships, gold in the M4x at the 2003 World Rowing Championships and a bronze in the M4x at the 2007 World Rowing Championships.

References 
 
 

1977 births
Living people
Sportspeople from Schwerin
Rowers at the 2000 Summer Olympics
Rowers at the 2004 Summer Olympics
Olympic rowers of Germany
World Rowing Championships medalists for Germany
German male rowers